Justin Pogge (born April 22, 1986) is a Canadian professional ice hockey goaltender currently playing with Grizzlys Wolfsburg of the Deutsche Eishockey Liga (DEL). He played in the National Hockey League with the Toronto Maple Leafs during the 2008–09 season. Internationally Pogge played for the Canadian national junior team at the 2006 World Junior Championship, winning a gold medal.

Playing career
Pogge played his first one-and-a-half seasons in the Western Hockey League (WHL) with the Prince George Cougars before being dealt to the Calgary Hitmen at the 2004–05 trade deadline. After his rookie season with the Cougars, he was drafted in the third round, 90th overall, by the Toronto Maple Leafs in the 2004 NHL Entry Draft. He was then signed to a three-year, entry-level contract by the Leafs on December 19, 2005. Playing for the Hitmen in 2005–06, Pogge was awarded the Four Broncos Memorial Trophy as league MVP as well as the CHL Goaltender of the Year Award and Del Wilson Trophy as the top WHL goaltender with a 1.72 goals against average (GAA) and 11 shutouts.

Pogge turned pro in 2006–07 with the Maple Leafs American Hockey League affiliate, the Toronto Marlies. He received his first call up to the Maple Leafs on January 11, 2008, but did not suit up and was reassigned to the Marlies the next day. Recording 19 wins and a 3.03 GAA in his professional rookie season, he was awarded the Marlies Fan Choice Award.

The following season, on December 21, 2008, Pogge earned another call-up from the Marlies and made his first NHL start against the Atlanta Thrashers the next night, recording a win in a 6–2 victory. On January 27, 2009, he suffered his first loss in the NHL versus the Minnesota Wild 6–1.

On August 10, 2009, Pogge was traded to the Anaheim Ducks for a conditional 2011 draft pick. On March 3, 2010, he was again traded to the Carolina Hurricanes as part of a deal that sent Aaron Ward to the Ducks.

On July 27, 2011, Pogge signed a one-year contract with the Phoenix Coyotes. He played for their AHL affiliate, the Portland Pirates for the duration of the season.

On July 18, 2012, Pogge decided to leave North American professional hockey and signed his first European contract with Ritten Sport of the Elite.A, a top level team in Italy, for the duration of the 2012–13 season.

Pogge then left for Sweden and signed a one-year contract with BIK Karlskoga in the HockeyAllsvenskan for the duration of the 2013–14 season.

On April 28, 2014, Pogge opted to remain in Sweden, and at an elevated level after signing a contract with Färjestad BK of the SHL. He left Färjestad after completing the 2015-16 season and signed with HC Slovan Bratislava of the Kontinental Hockey League (KHL) in May 2016.

After leaving Kölner Haie after two seasons, Pogge was signed signed to a one-year contract with his third DEL club, Grizzlys Wolfsburg, on July 26, 2022.

International play

In his third and final year of major junior, Pogge was named to Canada's national junior team for the 2006 World Junior Championships as the host nation in Vancouver, British Columbia. He was initially not invited to Canada's junior summer camp and was, therefore, not expected to make the team. However, Pogge was named to the team's final selection camp in December and earned the starting position. He led Team Canada to a second straight gold medal by posting a shutout with 35 saves against Russia in the 5–0 gold medal game victory. Pogge finished the tournament with 3 shutouts and a 1.00 GAA.

Later that year, during Pogge's professional rookie season with the Toronto Marlies, he represented Canada at the 2006 Spengler Cup in Davos, Switzerland. He helped Canada to the final game, where they lost to HC Davos 3–2. Pogge was criticized for surrendering the game winning goal after misplaying the puck behind his net, giving it away to the HC Davos player Andres Ambuhl.

Personal
Pogge married his fiancé Christina Heinzel in May 2013.

Career statistics

Regular season and playoffs

International

Awards and honours
Won a World Junior Championships gold medal with Team Canada in 2006.
Named the CHL Goaltender of the Year in 2006.
Awarded the Del Wilson Trophy (top goaltender in the WHL) in 2006.
Awarded the Four Broncos Memorial Trophy (player of the year in the WHL) in 2006.
Named to the WHL East First All-Star Team in 2006.
Awarded the Toronto Marlies Fan Choice Award in 2007.

References

External links

1986 births
Living people
Albany River Rats players
Bakersfield Condors (1998–2015) players
BIK Karlskoga players
Calgary Hitmen players
Canadian ice hockey goaltenders
Charlotte Checkers (2010–) players
Eisbären Berlin players
Färjestad BK players
Grizzlys Wolfsburg players
Ice hockey people from Alberta
Kölner Haie players
People from Fort McMurray
Portland Pirates players
Prince George Cougars players
Rögle BK players
San Antonio Rampage players
HC Slovan Bratislava players
Södertälje SK players
Ritten Sport players
Toronto Maple Leafs draft picks
Toronto Maple Leafs players
Toronto Marlies players
Canadian expatriate ice hockey players in Slovakia
Canadian expatriate ice hockey players in Italy
Canadian expatriate ice hockey players in Sweden
Canadian expatriate ice hockey players in the United States
Canadian expatriate ice hockey players in Germany